Epigrus is a genus of gastropods belonging to the family Epigridae. 

The species of this genus are found in Australia.

Species:

Epigrus columnaria 
Epigrus cylindraceus 
Epigrus insularis 
Epigrus iravadioides 
Epigrus obesus 
Epigrus truncatus 
Species brought into synonymy
 Epigrus borda Cotton, 1944: synonym of Epigrus cylindraceus (Tenison Woods, 1878)
 Epigrus dissimilis (R. B. Watson, 1886): synonym of Epigrus cylindraceus (Tenison Woods, 1878) 
 Epigrus fossilis Finlay, 1924 †: synonym of Chevallieria fossilis (Finlay, 1924) †
 Epigrus gracilis W. R. B. Oliver, 1915: synonym of Rissopsetia gracilis (W. R. B. Oliver, 1915)
 Epigrus ischnus (Tate, 1899): synonym of Epigrus cylindraceus (Tenison Woods, 1878)
 Epigrus pakaurangia Laws, 1944 †: synonym of Chevallieria pakaurangia (Laws, 1944) † (original combination)
 Epigrus prostriatus Laws, 1950 †: synonym of Microdryas prostriatus (Laws, 1950) †
 Epigrus protractus Hedley, 1904: synonym of Badepigrus protractus (Hedley, 1904) (original combination)
 Epigrus semicinctus May, 1915: synonym of Badepigrus semicinctus (May, 1915) (original combination)
 Epigrus striatus Powell, 1927: synonym of Microdryas striatus (Powell, 1927) (original combination)
 Epigrus waitotarana Laws, 1940 †: synonym of Chevallieria waitotarana (Laws, 1940) † (original combination)

References

 Ponder, W. F. (1967). The classification of the Rissoidae and Orbitestellidae with descriptions of some new taxa. Transactions of the Royal Society of New Zealand, Zoology. 9(17): 193-224, pls 1-13.

External links
 Hedley C. (1903). Scientific results of the trawling expedition of H.M.C.S. “Thetis” off the coast of New South Wales, in February and March, 1896. Mollusca. Part II. Scaphopoda and Gastropoda. Memoirs of the Australian Museum. 4: 327-402, pls 36-37.

Truncatelloidea
Gastropod genera